Lake Bramant is a lake in the Grandes Rousses massif of the French Alps.

Bramant